Kaho Na Yaar Hai is a friend-based reality show that aired on STAR Plus channel, and was hosted by Karan Patel. It started on 18 January 2008. The show aired on 18 October 2008 in the UK.

Host 
Karan Patel

Participant

Game Tasks 

 Kya Yahi Yaar Hai ... Round (Task) 1
 Yaar Hoshiyaar ... Round (Task) 2
 Yaara Da Tashan ... Round (Task) 3
 Yaar Ya Paar ... Round (Task) 4 [Final]

Prizes 
3 Night - 4 Day Trip To Pattaya ... For Winner.
3 Night - 4 Day Trip To South-east Asia's Exotic Country ... For Winner.(episode 7 only)
iPod ... For Runner UP By STAR Plus.

References

External links 
Official Site

Indian reality television series
StarPlus original programming
2008 Indian television series debuts
Television series by Optimystix Entertainment
Indian game shows